Burning Point is a Finnish power metal / heavy metal band, founded in 1999.

History
The band was founded in 1999 in Oulu, Finland, by bassist Jukka kyrö and guitarist Pete Ahonen.

In 2016 the band added vocalist Nitte Valo, formerly of the band Battle Beast. Valo started collaborating with the group in 2013 when guitarist Pete Ahonen asked her to collaborate on a few of the band's songs, and eventually asked her to join full-time as singer after he stepped down as vocalist.

Personnel

Current members 
 Luca Sturniolo – Vocals
 Pete Ahonen – Guitars
 Pekka Kolivuori – Guitars
 Tuomas Jaatinen – Drums
 Jarkko Poussu – Bass
 Matti Halonen – Keyboards

Former members 
 Jukka Jokikokko – Bass
 Pasi Hiltula – Keyboards (see Eternal Tears of Sorrow, Kalmah)
 Jukka Kyrö – Guitar
 Toni Kansanoja – Bass
 Jari Kaiponen – Drums
 Jarkko Väisänen – Keyboards
 Nitte Valo – Vocals
 Jussi Ontero – Drums
 Sami Nyman – Bass

Timeline

Discography

Albums 
 Salvation by Fire (2001)
 Feeding the Flames (2003)
 Burned Down the Enemy (2006)
 Empyre (2009)
 The Ignitor (2012)
 Burning Point (2015)
 The Blaze (2016)
 Arsonist of the Soul (2021)

Singles 
 To Hell and Back (CD-single 2004 on Poison Arrow Records)

References

External links 
 [ Burning Point] at AllMusic

Finnish heavy metal musical groups
Limb Music artists
Scarlet Records artists